Bjoka Gewog (Dzongkha: འབྱོག་ཀ་) is a gewog (village block) of Zhemgang District, Bhutan. Bjoka Gewog is also a part of Panbang Dungkhag (sub-district), along with Goshing, Ngangla, and Phangkhar Gewogs.

References

Gewogs of Bhutan
Zhemgang District